Tsuen may refer to:

Village in Cantonese
Estate in Cantonese, particularly public housing estates
Ha Tsuen, an area in the Yuen Long Town area of Hong Kong
Lam Tsuen River, a river in Tai Po
Lam Tsuen Valley, the valley through which the Lam Tsuen River flows
Lam Tsuen wishing trees, a shrine in Lam Tsuen, Hong Kong
Lam Tsuen, an area in Tai Po, in the New Territories of Hong Kong
Lee Tsuen Seng, a Malaysian Badminton player
Tsuen Wan (football club), a football team in the Hong Kong Football Association
Tsuen Wan District, a district of the Hong Kong Special Administrative Region of China
Tsuen Wan New Town, a town in the Hong Kong urban area
Tsuen Wan, a bay in the New Territories of Hong Kong
Yau Yat Tsuen, a residential area in Kowloon, Hong Kong